Nilakantha is a spider genus of the jumping spider family, Salticidae.

Species
, the World Spider Catalog accepted 4 species of Nilakantha:

 Nilakantha cockerelli Peckham & Peckham, 1901 – Hispaniola, Jamaica
 Nilakantha crucifera (F. O. Pickard-Cambridge, 1901) – Panama
 Nilakantha inerma (Bryant, 1940) – Cuba
 Nilakantha peckhami Bryant, 1940 – Cuba

References

Salticidae
Salticidae genera
Spiders of North America